New York Mills is a city in Otter Tail County, Minnesota, United States. The population was 1,294 at the 2020 census.

History

New York Mills was platted in 1883. The city was originally built up chiefly by Finns.

Geography

Climate

Transportation
U.S. Route 10 serves as a main route in the city.

Demographics

2010 census
As of the census of 2010, there were 1,199 people, 533 households, and 287 families living in the city. The racial makeup of the city was 94.8% White, 0.3% African American, 1.8% Native American, 0.3% from other races, and 2.8% from two or more races. Hispanic or Latino of any race were 1.8% of the population.

There were 533 households, of which 27.4% had children under the age of 18 living with them, 39.4% were married couples living together, 10.7% had a female householder with no husband present, 3.8% had a male householder with no wife present, and 46.2% were non-families. 40.0% of all households were made up of individuals, and 22.1% had someone living alone who was 65 years of age or older. The average household size was 2.12 and the average family size was 2.84.

The median age in the city was 38.9 years. 23.9% of residents were under the age of 18; 9% were between the ages of 18 and 24; 22% were from 25 to 44; 22.6% were from 45 to 64; and 22.5% were 65 years of age or older. The gender makeup of the city was 46.0% male and 54.0% female.

2000 census
As of the census of 2000, there were 1,158 people, 492 households, and 276 families living in the city. The racial makeup of the city was 98.53% White, 0.09% African American, 0.35% Native American, 0.17% from other races, and 0.86% from two or more races. Hispanic or Latino of any race were 1.30% of the population. 27.4% were of German, 25.5% Finnish, 13.5% Norwegian, and 5.4% Swedish ancestry.

There were 492 households, out of which 27.8% had children under the age of 18 living with them, 42.5% were married couples living together, 9.6% had a female householder with no husband present, and 43.9% were non-families. 40.0% of all households were made up of individuals, and 27.8% had someone living alone who was 65 years of age or older. The average household size was 2.18 and the average family size was 2.92.

In the city, the population was spread out, with 22.5% under the age of 18, 8.7% from 18 to 24, 20.6% from 25 to 44, 16.5% from 45 to 64, and 31.7% who were 65 years of age or older. The median age was 43 years. For every 100 females, there were 82.6 males. For every 100 females age 18 and over, there were 79.2 males.

The median income for a household in the city was $27,596, and the median income for a family was $35,536. Males had a median income of $29,286 versus $18,333 for females. The per capita income for the city was $15,949. About 11.7% of families and 17.1% of the population were below the poverty line, including 21.7% of those under age 18 and 19.0% of those age 65 or over.

Arts and economic development
New York Mills was founded in 1884 by Finnish immigrants. Major industries include agriculture (row crops, grain and dairy farming), Lund Boat Company fishing boat manufacturers, and a variety of service professions. Tourism is an increasingly important economic factor in the area; Otter Tail County contains 1,048 of the state's lakes,

New York Mills Regional Cultural Center
Faced with the economic challenges and decreasing population of many rural communities, New York Mills decided to invest in a Regional Arts Center in an attempt to bring tourism to the area. In 1991, the city contributed $35,000 to the Regional Arts Retreat and Cultural Center to convert a downtown mercantile building into a multi-use arts and cultural facility. As a per-capita investment, this expenditure was the equivalent of Minneapolis giving $13.7 million to an arts facility. The center, remodeled through a community-wide volunteer effort, opened in June 1992, as a nonprofit arts organization founded by John Davis. Further renovations include a hardwood maple floor in the main gallery and an outdoor deck completed in 2005. While other communities withered in the face of declining populations and deteriorating main streets, New York Mills has remained stable economically, and the Cultural Center continues to draw people, activity, revenue and national attention.

Programs
 Artist-In-Residence Program
 Education/Outreach programs
 Gallery Exhibits
 “Great American Think-Off” Annual Philosophical Debate
 Literary and Theater Events
 Music Concert Series
 Sculpture Park

Past exhibiting artists
 Robin Barcus Slonina
 Charles Beck
 Betsy Bowen
 Duane & Bambi Goodwin
 Eric Johnson
 Kent Kapplinger
 Maxwell MacKenzie
 David Salmela
 Charvis Harrell

Notable people
Peter Hayes, indie rock guitarist and singer
Janet Karvonen, pioneer for girls' basketball
Dean Simpson, businessman, Minnesota state legislator, and mayor

See also
 Finn Creek Museum

References

External links
ExploreNewYorkMills.com -- New York Mills, MN -- Visitor Information site
 City of New York Mills website

Cities in Minnesota
Cities in Otter Tail County, Minnesota
Populated places established in 1883
1883 establishments in Minnesota
Finnish-American culture in Minnesota